The Ben Williamson Memorial Bridge, known locally as the Old Ben, is a cantilever bridge that connects Coal Grove, Ohio to Ashland, Kentucky, crossing the Ohio River. Completed in 1932, it is named for Senator Ben M. Williamson. The bridge was formerly a two-way span before the parallel Simeon Willis Memorial Bridge was completed upstream in 1985. Since 1985, the Williamson bridge is used for southbound (Kentucky-bound) traffic.

Since the completion of the Willis bridge, the Williamson Bridge has been closed and traffic in both directions has been diverted to the Willis bridge four times. In 1989 and 2018, the Williamson bridge was closed for renovations and for painting in 2007.  The Williamson bridge was also closed and traffic again diverted to the Willis Bridge for several months in 2013 after a tractor-trailer ran into the tower on the Ohio side, causing structural damage to the bridge.

The shorter Ohio portion of the bridge officially carries part of Ohio State Route 652 but is not signed as such.

See also

 List of crossings of the Ohio River

References

External links
Ben Williamson Bridge at Bridges & Tunnels

Ashland, Kentucky
Bridges over the Ohio River
Bridges completed in 1932
Transportation in Lawrence County, Ohio
Buildings and structures in Lawrence County, Ohio
Road bridges in Kentucky
Road bridges in Ohio
Buildings and structures in Boyd County, Kentucky
Transportation in Boyd County, Kentucky
Bridges of the United States Numbered Highway System
Cantilever bridges in the United States